Jenny Williams (born 11 January 1957) is a South Australian athlete who represented South Australia in six sports, namely lacrosse, indoor lacrosse, touch, soccer, cricket and Australian rules football.

She is the daughter of Fos Williams, and the sister of Mark and Stephen Williams.

Williams was inducted into the KPMG South Australian Sport Hall of Fame in October 2013.

Lacrosse
Williams represented Australia in lacrosse and was a member of the 1986 World Champion Gold Medal team. She also captained Australia from 1989 to 1992 winning a bronze medal in the 1989 World Cup. She coached the Australian team to a world silver medal in 1997 in Tokyo, Japan. Notably, early in her career she was a member of the Australian team that won its first ever game against the United States in 1981 – the first recorded loss for the US.

Williams also captained or co-captained South Australia to 12 National Championships in lacrosse (11 consecutive wins) and was named in the National Championship team in each of these years. She also received the player of the Nationals Award in 1986 earning best a field votes in every game.

Williams was the founder and playing captain/coach of the Adelaide Teachers College Lacrosse club in 1980, which became known as UniSA Lacrosse Club in later years. The Club went on to win 10 League championships in the next 15 years with Jenny winning the Association Best and fairest in 1980 and being named in the team of the year as a player / coach 10 times. She has played more than 500 A grade games and 100 representative State or Australian Games.

Williams was also involved in sports administration both at club and state level. She was President of the SA Women's Lacrosse Association the year before the group amalgamated with the men becoming Lacrosse SA. She also coached the U/16s to a National Championship win and was awarded her State Umpiring certification.

Touch
Williams captained-coached the College Touch Team who won four League titles and she won the Association Best and Fairest in both the Women's and Mixed Competitions. She was selected in the Australian squad in 1984 and Captained SA from 1982 to 1985. She was also involved as a coach where she co-coached the State U/16 to 3rd place in a Nationals.

Cricket
Williams reprented South Australia in cricket as wicketkeeper from 1978 to 1982 winning the National Championships in 1981 and being selected as Wicketkeeper of the tournament that year. Her club team College won 5 years of A Grade District Premierships.

Soccer
Williams played as either wing or centre forward for College and South Australia (1980–1982) in soccer. ACAE (College) won the League Championship and the Ampol Cup twice.

Australian Rules Football
In 1990 Williams co-founded the SA Women's Football Association with Gina Dutschke. She captained the first Interstate match at Glenelg Oval on September winning the trophy for best on ground in the game.

In 2003 Williams was awarded the AFL Football Woman of the Year award for her contribution to the sport. She has subsequently developed a modified version of the game "Nines". She wrote the curriculum for and conducted Year 12 Australian Rules Football as part of the South Australian Certificate of Education (SACE) Work Education Unit. She also worked in the media as a writer of football articles in the South Australian paper The News.

Professional career
Williams was originally a physical education teacher. Throughout her sporting career she has coached junior teams ranging from all of her chosen sports and others such as tennis, basketball and volleyball. She was Head of Department and Sportsmistress at Immanuel College for 10 years and a physical education teacher at Sacred Heart College.  In 1989 and 1990 Williams was Acting Women's Advisor to the Minister of Recreation and Sport. In 1997–2000 she worked as a Research Officer for Sports Medicine Australia winning an AFL research grant in 2000.

In 2004 Williams co-authored a children's book with her brother, AFL Coach Mark Williams, that went to the top of the best seller list in South Australia. She has also written a Heart Rate Monitor for students and has had research published in a variety of journals ranging from the British Journal of Psychology through to Indigenous Council reports. She has also been involved in the Premier's Reading Challenge, a South Australian Government initiative for children's literacy.

Williams returned to university in 2004 and over a period of six years completed a graduate diploma of Psychology, a Bachelor's of Behavioural Science and completed a Master's of Psychology (Work and Organizational).

In 2010 Williams was employed by Port Adelaide Football Club as a team psychologist.
 
In 2011 Williams worked as the psychologist for the Elite School of Golf and was the Principal Director for Best on Ground Performance. She  has worked in conjunction with former Australian basketball coach Phil Smyth in coach and leadership education under the banner of Perfect Preparation.

In 2020 Williams was hired by Adelaide United Football Club as a sports psychologist.

References

External links
 The Age

1957 births
Living people
Australian lacrosse players
Sportswomen from South Australia
Sportspeople from Adelaide
University of South Australia alumni
People educated at Immanuel College, Adelaide
Jenny
Australian rules footballers from South Australia
Australian women cricketers
Australian women's soccer players
Women's association footballers not categorized by position